Emanuel Carr Smith (April 8, 1901 – April 14, 1989) was an outfielder for the 1923 and 1924 Washington Senators.

References
 Baseball Reference

1901 births
1989 deaths
Major League Baseball outfielders
Washington Senators (1901–1960) players
Raleigh Capitals players
Terre Haute Tots players
Williamsport Grays players
Norfolk Tars players
Baseball players from North Carolina